The Charm of Seville is a 1931 (Spanish title:El embrujo de Sevilla) French-German-Spanish drama film directed by Benito Perojo. It was a Spanish-language film made by the director Benito Berojo in studios in France and Germany because the sound equipment was better than in Spain. location shots of Seville were also added. The film's sets were designed by the art director Fernando Mignoni. It is now considered a lost film. A separate French-language version was also released.

Cast
 María Fernanda Ladrón de Guevara as Pastora 
 Rafael Rivelles as Paco Quiñones 
 María Luz Callejo as Rosarito 
 María Dalbaicín as Pura  
 José González Marín as El Pitoche  
 Rayito as Himself

References

Bibliography
 Bentley, Bernard. A Companion to Spanish Cinema. Boydell & Brewer 2008.

External links 

1931 films
1931 drama films
Spanish drama films
1930s Spanish-language films
Films directed by Benito Perojo
Films set in Seville
French multilingual films
Lost French films
German multilingual films
Spanish multilingual films
German drama films
Lost German films
Lost Spanish films
German black-and-white films
French black-and-white films
Spanish black-and-white films
1931 multilingual films
Lost drama films
1931 lost films
1930s German films
Spanish-language French films